Simbara Maki (12 October 1938 – 8 October 2010) was an Ivorian hurdler. He competed in the 110 metres hurdles at the 1964, 1968 and the 1972 Summer Olympics. Maki won a bronze medal in the 110 metres hurdles at the 1965 All-Africa Games.

References

1938 births
2010 deaths
Athletes (track and field) at the 1964 Summer Olympics
Athletes (track and field) at the 1968 Summer Olympics
Athletes (track and field) at the 1972 Summer Olympics
Ivorian male hurdlers
Olympic athletes of Ivory Coast
African Games bronze medalists for Ivory Coast
African Games medalists in athletics (track and field)
Place of birth missing
Athletes (track and field) at the 1965 All-Africa Games